This is a List of National Historic Landmarks in New Jersey and other landmarks of equivalent landmark status in the state.  The United States National Historic Landmark (NHL) program is operated under the auspices of the National Park Service, and recognizes structures, districts, objects, and similar resources according to a list of criteria of national significance. There are 58 NHLs in New Jersey.

Current NHLs in New Jersey

There are NHLs in seventeen of the twenty-one counties in the state.  Mercer County has fourteen NHLs, in and around Princeton, New Jersey.

|}

Historic areas in the United States National Park System
National Historic Sites, National Historic Parks, National Memorials, and certain other areas listed in the National Park system are historic landmarks of national importance that are highly protected already, often before the inauguration of the NHL program in 1960, and are often not also named NHLs per se.  There are four of these in New Jersey.  The National Park Service lists these three together with the NHLs in the state,  These are:

See also
List of National Historic Landmarks by state
National Register of Historic Places listings in New Jersey

References

External links 
National Historic Landmarks Program, at National Park Service
National Park Service listings of National Historic Landmarks

New Jersey

National Historic Landmarks
National Historic Landmarks